Liang Yuan, is a traditional building surrounded by gardens in the Chancheng District of Foshan City in Guangdong Province, China. The building contains living residences, temples and gardens and is well known for its fantastic rocks.

History 

Liang Yuan was built during the Qing dynasty by Liang Airu when he spent a sum of money to build a garden. From then on, the Liang family continued the project and eventually completed it. However, during the early Republic it was almost destroyed. In view of the historical and artistic value of the garden, Foshan Council decided to protect it. In 1984 it was then named 'Liang Yuan'. It is protected as a cultural building.

Place of interests 

Located in Foshan, Guangdong, Liang Yuan is open to tourists from 8:30 to 17:30.

Artistic value

The whole structure

Liang Yuan is made up of living residences, temples and gardens and is known for its fantastic rocks. There are four groups of gardens in different styles, which stand for Spring with Hermitage, Summer with Lake, Autumn with Stars and Winter with Snow.

Rock art

It is said that there are more than 400 rocks inside Liang Yuan. The rocks were arranged by Liang Airu with some named according to Chinese legends including "Su Wu Tending Sheep Rock", and "The Boys Worship Guanyin Rock".

Culture and humanity

Liang Yuan is built in a typical style used by Qing dynasty literati. With the purpose of pursuing natural and picturesque Liang Yuan is surrounded by streams and is planted with many willow trees. It not only expresses literati' pursuit of staying away from the hustle and bustle of life in cities but enjoying the happiness in a garden, but also reflects Ghuangdong culture properly.

Buildings and sightseeing 
There are many buildings in Liang Yuan.

Buildings around Liang Yuan

Pei De Li (培德里) 
Pei De Li is a street near Liang Yuan that has many old and traditional buildings.

The beginning of Pei De Li
It's said that Pei De Li was the house of Wang Liqing, who was the first president of the Chamber of Commerce. A local citizen said that it was built by a silk businessman, who wanted his children to study hard. 

Pei De Li in the future
With the development of economy, more and more traditional buildings are destroyed or rebuilt, so government can build up new institutions to develop cities. 
Pei De Li is under protection from the government and attracts many tourists.

Honglu street (红路直街) 

Honglu street is a flea market behind Liang Yuan next to Pei De Li. too. There are many shops selling ceramics, shoes, jades, etc.

See also
 List of Chinese gardens

References 

Buildings and structures in Foshan
Tourist attractions in Foshan